Charles Viner (1678–5 June 1756) was an English jurist, known as the author of Viner's Abridgment, and the benefactor of the Vinerian chair and the Vinerian Scholarship at the University of Oxford.

Life
The son of Mary and Charles Viner, a draper of Salisbury, he was baptised at the church of St. Thomas, Salisbury, on 3 November 1678. He studied for a time at Oxford, where he matriculated at Hart Hall on 19 February 1695. He then resided at Aldershot, Hampshire, and had chambers in the Temple (King's Bench Walk), but was not called to the bar. He married Raleigh Weekes (1681–1761), a descendant of Walter Raleigh, on 16 November 1699 at Saint Ethelburga's church in Bishopsgate in London.  There were no children from the marriage.

Viner died at Aldershot on 5 June 1756. He and his wife are buried in the churchyard of St Michael's church in Aldershot and have a memorial plaque inside the church.

Legacy
By his will, dated 29 December 1755, Viner left the remainder copies of the Abridgment and his residuary real and personal estate (value about £12,000) to the University of Oxford upon trusts. Effect was given to the bequest by the endowment of the Vinerian common-law chair, scholarships, and fellowships. The first professor was Sir William Blackstone.

Viner's Abridgment

Viner devoted half a century to the compilation of A General Abridgment of Law and Equity. Alphabetically digested under proper Titles, with Notes and References to the whole, Aldershot, 1742–53, 23 vols. folio. It was printed on a press at his home in Aldershot on paper manufactured under Viner's own direction with his initials 'C.V.' in the watermark.

Based on the work of Viner's predecessor Henry Rolle, but built up from other material, it is a vast encyclopædia of legal lore. An Alphabetical Index was compiled by Robert Kelham (1758). A second edition of the work, including the index, appeared at London in 1791–4, 24 vols., and was followed by a supplement by several hands, entitled An Abridgment of the Modern Determinations in the Courts of Law and Equity, London, 1799–1806, 6 vols.

J. G. Marvin wrote of it:

References
Viner, C. A General Abridgment of Law and Equity, Alphabetically Digested under proper Titles; with Notes and References to the Whole. 23 vols. fol. Aldershot. 1742 - 53. 2d ed. 24 vols. 8vo. London. 1791 - 94.

Notes

Attribution

1678 births
1756 deaths
18th-century jurists
English legal professionals
English legal writers
People from Salisbury
Writers from Aldershot
Lawyers from Hampshire